The Netherlands Antilles competed at the 1976 Summer Olympics in Montreal, Quebec, Canada.

References
Official Olympic Reports

Nations at the 1976 Summer Olympics
1976 Summer Olympics
1976 in the Netherlands Antilles